Michael Deacon (sometimes Dyacon or Diacon)  was  Bishop of St Asaph from  1495 until his death in 1500.

Deacon,  the King's Confessor was buried in St Paul's Chapel at Westminster Abbey.

References 

15th-century English Roman Catholic bishops
Bishops of St Asaph
1500 deaths